This is a list of numbered county roads in Renfrew County, Ontario, Canada.

Renfrew